Lauter-Bernsbach is a town in the Erzgebirgskreis district, in Saxony, Germany. It was formed on 1 January 2013 by the merger of the former town Lauter and municipality Bernsbach.

References 

Erzgebirgskreis